Aydınlar is a town (belde) in Adilcevaz District, Bitlis Province, Turkey. Its population is 2,053 (2021).

References

Towns in Turkey
Populated places in Bitlis Province
Adilcevaz District